The Winifred Atwell Show was a British TV series which aired 1956 to 1957. It starred pianist Winifred Atwell, who had had a number of hits on the UK charts.

Regulars performers included comedy act Morecambe and Wise, and singing act Teddy Johnson and Pearl Carr, and all episodes are believed to be lost. It spent part of its run on the BBC, and part of its run on ITV.

Atwell did a later series in the early 1960s called The Amazing Miss A, of which most episodes survive.

She was likely the first black woman to have her own series on British television.

References

External links
The Winifred Atwell Show on IMDb

1956 British television series debuts
1957 British television series endings
Lost BBC episodes
Black-and-white British television shows
English-language television shows
1950s British television series
British variety television shows